Scarbro is a census-designated place (CDP) and coal town in Fayette County, West Virginia, United States. Scarbro has a post office with ZIP code 25917. As of the 2010 census, its population was 486.

The community was named for the fact a large share of the first settlers were named Scarbrough.

References

Census-designated places in Fayette County, West Virginia
Census-designated places in West Virginia
Coal towns in West Virginia